KTFQ-TV (channel 41) is a television station in Albuquerque, New Mexico, United States, broadcasting the Spanish-language UniMás network to most of the state. It is owned by Entravision Communications, which provides certain services to Univision-owned station KLUZ-TV (channel 14) under a local marketing agreement (LMA) with TelevisaUnivision USA. Both stations share studios on Broadbent Parkway in northeastern Albuquerque, while KTFQ-TV's transmitter is located on Sandia Crest.

History

In 1997, Paxson Communications was awarded a construction permit for a new station on channel 14, which was previously used by KGSW-TV from 1981 to 1993; on April 8, 1999, it signed on as KAPX, airing programming from the family-oriented Pax TV (later i: Independent Television, now Ion Television) from 11 a.m. and 11 p.m., along with infomercials during the day and The Worship Network during the overnight hours. Pax would subsequently cut its programming hours from 4 to 11 p.m., and later 5 to 11 p.m., due to financial problems at Paxson. The company then chose to sell some of its stations, including KAPX; in 2003, Univision bought the station, and that June relaunched channel 14 as Telefutura (now UniMás) affiliate KTFQ. The network was previously seen in Albuquerque on KTFA-LP (channel 48), which switched to HSN. Programming from The Worship Network continued to air overnights on KTFQ for several years afterward.

On December 4, 2017, as part of a channel swap made by Entravision Communications, KTFQ and sister station KLUZ swapped channel numbers, with KTFQ moving from digital channel 22 and virtual channel 14 to digital channel 42 and virtual channel 41.

Technical information

Subchannels
The station's digital signal is multiplexed:

Analog-to-digital conversion
Because it was granted an original construction permit after the FCC finalized the DTV allotment plan on April 21, 1997. The station did not receive a companion channel for a digital television station. Instead, on June 12, 2009, which is the end of the digital TV conversion period for full-service stations, KTFQ-TV was required to turn off its analog signal and turn on its digital signal (called a "flash-cut"). KTFQ has been assigned channel 22 for its digital broadcast. Through the use of PSIP, digital television receivers display the station's virtual channel as its former UHF analog channel 14.

References

External links

Hispanic and Latino American culture in Albuquerque, New Mexico
Television channels and stations established in 1999
UniMás network affiliates
LATV affiliates
Charge! (TV network) affiliates
TheGrio affiliates
Mass media in Albuquerque, New Mexico
TFQ-TV
Entravision Communications stations
1999 establishments in New Mexico